Punta Final Airstrip is a public airstrip located in Punta Final, Municipality of Ensenada, Baja California, Mexico, a little village located on the Gulf of California coast. The airstrip is used solely for general aviation purposes. The PFL code is used as identifier.

External links
Punta Final Info
Baja Bush Pilots forum about PFL.

Airports in Baja California